Parpola is a Finnish surname. Notable people with the surname include:

Asko Parpola (born 1941), Finnish Indologist and Sindhologist
Simo Parpola (born 1943) Finnish Assyriologist, brother of Asko

Finnish-language surnames